Igor Bugaiov (also romanized as Bugaev) (born 26 June 1984) is a Moldovan footballer who plays as a striker for FC Tighina in the Moldovan "A" Division.

Career
Bugaiov began playing with his home-town team FC Dinamo Bender in the Moldovan National Division. In 2004, he moved to another Moldovan team, CS Tiligul-Tiras Tiraspol. The following season, he moved to Ukraine to play for FC Chornomorets Odessa. After two years there he was released, and was drafted into the Ceahlăul Piatra Neamț squad for the remainder of the 2007–08 season. He played a handful of games but was unable to help the team avoid relegation. On 31 July 2008, he was announced as an addition to the FC Ural team, who were in the midst of their season in the Russian First Division. In March 2009, he made a return to Moldova, signing with FC Academia UTM Chișinău, and scoring a hat-trick on his debut.

On 22 June 2009, he signed a 3-year deal with Ukrainian side FC Metalurh Zaporizhya.

International career
Bugaiov was a member of the Moldova national team from 2007 to 2017.

International goals
Scores and results list Moldova's goal tally first.

Honours
Astana
Kazakhstan Cup: 2010
Kazakhstan Super Cup: 2011

Milsami Orhei
Moldovan Cup: 2017–18

References

External links
 
 

1984 births
Living people
People from Bender, Moldova
Moldovan footballers
Moldova international footballers
Liga I players
Ukrainian Premier League players
Kazakhstan Premier League players
Moldovan Super Liga players
Moldovan expatriate footballers
Expatriate footballers in Russia
Moldovan expatriate sportspeople in Russia
FC Chornomorets Odesa players
FC Metalurh Zaporizhzhia players
Expatriate footballers in Ukraine
Moldovan expatriate sportspeople in Ukraine
CSM Ceahlăul Piatra Neamț players
Expatriate footballers in Romania
Moldovan expatriate sportspeople in Romania
Expatriate footballers in Kazakhstan
Moldovan expatriate sportspeople in Kazakhstan
FC Ural Yekaterinburg players
FC Astana players
FC Tobol players
FC Tighina players
CSF Bălți players
FC Dacia Chișinău players
FC Irtysh Pavlodar players
FC Milsami Orhei players
FC Dinamo-Auto Tiraspol players
Association football forwards
FC Florești players